Laélio Baptista Airport  is the airport serving Maricá, Brazil.

Airlines and destinations
No scheduled flights operate at this airport.

Access

Gallery

See also

List of airports in Brazil

References

External links

Airports in Rio de Janeiro (state)